Thiruvananthapuram District Football Association (TDFA) is the organisation responsible for association football in and around the Indian city of Thiruvananthapuram. It is affiliated to the State Association, the Kerala Football Association, which in turn is affiliated with the All India Football Federation(AIFF).

History
The Thiruvananthapuram District Football Association (TDFA), one of the oldest is the official District body for development, conduct and organization of football in the city of Thiruvananthapuram and its suburbs.

Notable players
 Jobby Justin
M Rajeev Kumar
Ganeshan
Thomas Sebastian
Vinu Jose

Thiruvananthapuram Football Leagues

The TDFA organizes Thiruvananthapuram Football League with 8 divisions, containing approximately 53 club sides with 213 matches.

Men
 Elite League
Super Division
 A Division
 B Division
 C Division
 D Division
 E Division
 F Division
 G Division

References

Thiruvananthapuram district
Football in India